An Artists Open House is a special example of an Open Studio whereby the studio is a residential venue, usually a house or a garden. The format of an Open House is very similar to an Open Studio, but the significantly lower cost of exhibiting in a residential venue than a studio or gallery provides more artists an opportunity to exhibit their work.

History 
Artists Open Houses are perhaps best known in Brighton and Hove in the UK as taking place alongside the Brighton Festival and Brighton Festival Fringe. 

In 1982 Ned Hoskins and Stella Cardus filled their home with Ned's and other artists work in protest at the lack of visual arts in the Brighton Festival. 
Hoskins and Cardus had started a new phenomenon. This became the Fiveways Artists Group, named after the area of the city known as Fiveways. They were soon followed by other groupings of Artists' Open Houses in other areas around Brighton and Hove, including Beyond The Level, founded 1996 (from city area The Level) and Kemptown Artists (from city area Kemptown). In 2008 there were around 1000 artists exhibiting work in over 200 houses, divided into 13 trails, together with many independent open houses. 

In 2002 the Artists Open Houses Festival broke away from the official and fringe Brighton Festivals to become an independent organization, often simplified to just AOH, producing its own brochure and website.

Currently 
In Brighton, the Artists Open Houses Festival still runs concurrently with the Brighton Festival and Brighton Festival Fringe. These three organizations, along with many other projects that happen during the three weeks of the festival, work together to create a diverse range of art available for display around the city. 

A similar organization in Cheltenham also runs for a week at the beginning of June. Originally called Cheltenham Artists Open Houses, but now known as Cheltenham Art Festival & Open Studios. 

The Helfa gelf/Art Trail that covers much of North Wales includes many Artists Open Houses amongst its participating studios.

Also unlinked Artists Open House events happen in parts of England: Bath, Birmingham, Bristol, Leicester, Manchester, Oxford, Peterborough, Stroud, Somerset and Worthing, and in Scotland: Ayrshire, Dumfries and Galloway (Spring Fling), to name but a few, all have ones of their own.

External links

Artists' studios in the United Kingdom
Arts festivals in the United Kingdom